Senator Courtney may refer to:

Jonathan Courtney (born 1966), Maine State Senate
Peter Courtney (born 1943), Oregon State Senate
Thomas G. Courtney (born 1947), Iowa State Senate
Thomas J. Courtney (1892–1971), Illinois State Senate